This is a list of Al-Zawraa's results at the Iraqi Premier League 2008-09 and AFC Cup 2009. The club is competing in the Iraqi Premier League and AFC Cup.

Al-Zawraa’s massive problems

Financial problems 
Before the start of the 2008-09 season, The Iraq Football Association announced that they are no longer able to afford financing the Iraqi clubs and hence each club had to get an official sponsor. Since the Iraqi clubs are based on institutions, military bases and ministries, Al-Zawraa's official sponsor is Ministry of Transport.
 
The Problem began when Amer Abdul-Jabbar, the Minister of Transport offered financing the club but in exchange of changing the club's name From Al-Zawraa to Transport. But when Al-Zawraa fans heard this news, 8 million Iraqis announced their Civil disobedience if they change Al-Zawraa name.  Even the Iraq Football Association refused the idea of changing Al-Zawraa's name.  Salam Hashim the current President of the club made a middle Solution to change Al-Zawraa name from Al-Zawra to Al-Zawraa Transport, both the fans and the Minister of Transport refused the idea.

Withdrawal threats 
In the middle of the 2008-09 season, Salam Hashim announced that Al-Zawraa will withdraw from the Iraqi League and the AFC Cup if no one give Al-Zawraa a helping hand, but the Prime Minister of Iraq Nouri al-Maliki reacted and gave Al-Zawraa 10 Million Iraqi Dinars for their camping in the Iraqi League and the AFC Cup, he promised monthly finance backing.

Transfer problems 
At the beginning of the season. Al-Zawraa had to sell their key players like top scorer Abdul-Salam Abood, the Defensive Midfielder Mohannad Nassir and the main goalkeeper Ahmad Ali Jaber due to financial problems. They bought only young players and using some from Al-Zawraa's youth team. But in a brave act from the Iraq national football team’s goalkeeper Mohammed Gassid who moved to Al-Zawraa for a cheap salary saying he doesn’t care about the money and he loves Al-Zawraa and playing for Al-Zawraa is like a dream to him. Similar act happened from Haidar Sabah who preferred to come back to Al-Zawraa instead of extending his contract with Arbil FC, the richest team in Iraq.

Before the winter transfers period, the 34-year-old striker and the son of the club Hesham Mohammed promised that he will come back to Al-Zawraa and try to help them with his experience. Hesham is famous in wearing number 8 and when he asked what is the number he will pick, he answered that Haidar Sabah earned this number and he will choose another number, thinking of picking number 88. In the winter transfers period he fulfilled his promise and signed for Al-Zawraa.

Banning the whole team 
Before the end of the season, Al-Zawra’s President Salam Hashim banned 25 players for playing for Al-Zawra. The story began when 15 players asked for their wages, complaining that they didn’t receive any money in the last three months. But Salam Hashim blamed the Ministry of Transport for not supporting Al-Zawra and he told the players that he doesn’t have any money in the moment and he will give them next season, the players refused to play giving the reason that they are human and they need to eat and to pay for their houses rent. The rest of the team stood up solidarity with the team, which made Salam Hashim banning the whole team. Al-Zawra had 4 postponed matches and if Al-Zawra win them all Al-Zawra would reach the second place in Group B which it will makes them the play the decisive 3rd-4th place match. The Team played the postponed matches with the u-16 team with Ahmad Salam Hashim the son of Salam Hashim being the Captain of the team. Al-Zawra lost three matches and draw one.

2008-09 squad and starting lineup 

Bold = National team players

Changes in

Changes out

Iraqi Premier League 

The 2008-09 season is the 35th edition of the Iraqi Premier League, it starts on 1 November 2008 and is scheduled to end on 10 May 2009. 28 teams from all over the country are competing for the title. Arbil FC are the defending champion and Al-Zawraa are the runner-up.

The IFA decided to cancel the old group system, which was used from 2004 until 2008. This time, the 28 teams will be divided into two groups with each 14 teams. There will be a northern and southern group, with the clubs from the capital Baghdad being drawn into either one of these groups. After playing home and away games, the two group winners are going to play for the League Title in a final. The two runners-up are playing for the third place and a spot at the 2009-10 Arab Champions League. The league champions and runner-up will qualify for the 2010 AFC Cup. Furthermore, it was announced that this will be the last season featuring groups.

Al-Zawraa is grouped in Group B.

Group B standing

Results summary

Results by round

Matches 

 Pos = Postponed

Top scorers

AFC Cup 

Iraq was excluded from the AFC Champions League due to not fulfilling the AFC demand of having a fully professional league. Hence, the Iraqi clubs relegated to the AFC Cup with having 2 seats to participate in. The 2007-08 Iraqi Premier League's Champion and runners-up will participate this season.

Al-Zawraa as runner-up in the previous season will take part in the AFC Cup for the first time in their history alongside Arbil FC as last season champions.

Group B

Round of 16

Top scorers (AFC Cup)

References

External links 
 Al-Zawraa official website (Arabic)

2008-09
Iraqi football clubs 2008–09 season